The Roman Catholic Diocese of Kilwa–Kasenga is a diocese located in the cities of Kilwa and Kasenga  in the Ecclesiastical province of Lubumbashi in the Democratic Republic of the Congo.

History
 July 8, 1948: Established as Apostolic Prefecture of Lac Moero from the Apostolic Vicariate of Lulua and Central Katanga
 August 24, 1962: Promoted as Diocese of Kilwa
 August 4, 1977: Renamed as Diocese of Kilwa – Kasenga

Leadership, in reverse chronological order
 Bishops of Kilwa–Kasenga (Latin Rite), below
 Bishop Fulgence Muteba Mugalu (2005.03.18 – 2021.05.22), appointed Archbishop of Lubumbashi
 Bishop Jean-Pierre Tafunga Mbayo, S.D.B. (1992.10.06 – 2002.06.10), appointed Bishop of Uvira
 Bishop Dominique Kimpinde Amando (1980.03.28 – 1989.03.31), appointed Bishop of Kalemie-Kirungu
 Bishop André Ilunga Kaseba (1977.08.04 – 1979.04.09), appointed Bishop of Kalemie-Kirungu; see below
 Bishops of Kilwa (Latin Rite), below
 Bishop André Ilunga Kaseba (1975.12.19 – 1977.08.04); see above
 Bishop Joseph Alain Leroy, O.F.M. (1962.08.24 – 1975.12.19)
 Prefect Apostolic of Lac Moero (Latin Rite), below
 Fr. Jean François Waterschoot, O.F.M. (1948.11.19 – 1962)

See also
Roman Catholicism in the Democratic Republic of the Congo

Sources
 GCatholic.org
 Catholic Hierarchy

Roman Catholic dioceses in the Democratic Republic of the Congo
Christian organizations established in 1948
Roman Catholic dioceses and prelatures established in the 20th century
1948 establishments in the Belgian Congo
Roman Catholic Ecclesiastical Province of Lubumbashi